See also Atolls of the Maldives for an in-depth description of the atolls.

Maldives is an island country in the Indian Ocean, South Asia, south-southwest of India. It consists of approximately 1,190 coral islands grouped in a double chain of 26 atolls, spread over roughly 90,000 square kilometers, making this one of the most geographically dispersed countries in the world. Only near the southern end of this natural coral barricade do two open passages permit safe ship navigation from one side of the Indian Ocean to the other through the territorial waters of Maldives. For administrative purposes the Maldives government organized these atolls into twenty-one administrative divisions.

The largest island of Maldives is Gan, which belongs to Laamu Atoll or Hahdhummathi Maldives.

Geographic coordinates:

Physical geography 

Most atolls of the Maldives consist of a large, ring-shaped coral reef supporting numerous small islands.

The islands are too small to have rivers, but small lakes and marshes can be found in some of them.

On average, each atoll has approximately 5 to 10 inhabited islands; the uninhabited islands of each atoll number approximately 20 to 60. Some atolls, however, consist of one large, isolated island surrounded by a steep coral beach. The most notable example of this type of atoll is the large island of Fuvahmulah situated in the Equatorial Channel.

The tropical vegetation of Maldives differs in the inhabited and in the uninhabited islands. Inhabited islands have small groves of banana, papaya, drumstick and citrus trees by the homesteads, while breadfruit trees and coconut palms are grown in available patches of land. On the other hand, uninhabited islands have mostly different kinds of bushes (magū, boshi) and mangroves (kuredi, kandū) along the waterline as well as some coconut trees.

Some islands are marshy, while others are higher owing to sand and gravel having been piled up by wave action. Often the soil is highly alkaline, and a deficiency in nitrogen, potash, and iron severely limits agricultural potential. Ten percent of the land, or about 26 km2, is cultivated with taro, bananas, coconuts, and other fruit. Only the lush island of Fuvammulah produces fruits such as oranges and pineapples – partly because the terrain of Fuvammulah sits higher than most other islands, leaving the groundwater less subject to seawater penetration. However, as population grows, even in this island the cultivated areas are shrinking rapidly.

Freshwater floats in a layer known as "Ghyben/Herzberg lens" above the seawater that permeates the limestone and coral sands of the islands. These lenses are shrinking rapidly on Male and on many islands where there are resorts catering to foreign tourists. Mango trees already have been reported dying on Male because of salt penetration. Most residents of the atolls depend on groundwater or rainwater for drinking purposes.

Climate

The temperature of Maldives ranges between  throughout the year. Although the humidity is relatively high, the constant sea breezes help to keep the air moving. Two seasons dominate Maldives' weather: the dry season associated with the winter northeast monsoon and the rainy season brought by the summer southwest monsoon. Because the Maldives is the lowest country anywhere in the world, with the highest elevation in the island nation being slightly less than 8 feet, the temperature is constantly high and rarely falls below 25 °C (77 °F), even at night.

The weather in Maldives is affected by the large landmass of the South Asia to the north. The presence of this landmass causes differential heating of land and water. Scientists also cite other factors in the formation of monsoons, including the barrier of the Himalayas on the northern fringe of the South Asia and the sun's northward tilt, which shifts the jet stream north. These factors set off a rush of moisture-rich air from the Indian Ocean over the South Asia, resulting in the southwest monsoon. The hot air that rises over the South Asia during April and May creates low-pressure areas into which the cooler, moisture-bearing winds from the Indian Ocean flow. In Maldives, the wet southwest monsoon lasts from the end of April to the end of October and brings the worst weather with strong winds and storms. In May 1991 violent monsoon winds created tidal waves that damaged thousands of houses and piers, flooded arable land with seawater, and uprooted thousands of fruit trees. The damage caused was estimated at US$30 million.

The shift from the moist southwest monsoon to the dry northeast monsoon over the South Asia occurs during October and November. During this period, the northeast winds contribute to the formation of the northeast monsoon, which reaches Maldives in the beginning of December and lasts until the end of March. However, the weather patterns of Maldives do not always conform to the monsoon patterns of the South Asia. Rain showers over the whole country have been known to persist for up to one week during the midst of the dry season.

Climate change

Area and boundaries

Area:
total:

land:
298 km2
water:
0 km2

Coastline:

Maritime claims:
measured from claimed archipelagic baselines
territorial sea:

contiguous zone:

exclusive economic zone:

Elevation extremes:
lowest point:
Indian Ocean 0 m
highest point:
unnamed location on Vilingili Island in the Addu Atoll  [The Maldives constitute the flattest country, i.e. they have the lowest high-point, of any country in the world).

Resources and land use
Natural resources:
fish

Land use:
arable land:
10%
permanent crops:
10%
other:
80% (2011)

Irrigated land:
0 km2 (2003)

Total renewable water resources:
0.03 km3 (2011)

Environmental concerns
Natural hazards:
tsunamis; low level of islands makes them very sensitive to sea level rise. 
Some scientists fear it could be underwater by 2050 or 2100. The UN's environmental panel has warned that, at current rates, sea level would be high enough to make the country uninhabitable by 2100.
President Mohamed Nasheed aims to turn the Maldives into an entirely carbon neutral nation by 2020.

Environment – current issues:
depletion of freshwater aquifers threatens water supplies, global warming and sea level rise, coral reef bleaching

Environment – international agreements:
Biodiversity, Climate Change, Climate Change-Kyoto Protocol, Desertification, Hazardous Wastes, Law of the Sea, Ozone Layer Protection, Ship Pollution

Statistics
 Position: degree of latitude: 07° 06'30" N to 00° 41'48" S and degree of longitude: 72° 32'30" E to 73° 45'54" E westside of India and Sri Lanka.
 Range: in length approx. 750 km (from north to south) / in width approx. 120 km (from west to east)
 Land territory: 1,196 mostly deserted islands with a total area of approx. 298 km2.
 The islands are in average 1.8 m above sea level.
 Distances: shortest distance to India: approx. 340 km and to Sri Lanka approx. 700 km.

Nearest nation

 India (Laccadives)

References

 
Maldives

bn:মালদ্বীপ#ভূগোল